José Joaquín Álvarez de Toledo y Caro, 19th Duke of Medina Sidonia (28 December 1865 – 9 June 1915) was Duke of Medina Sidonia from 1905.

In  Madrid in 1893 he married his cousin Rosalía Caro y Caro.

Biography
He was born the second son of José Álvarez de Toledo y Silva, 18th Duke of Medina Sidonia, and Rosalía Caro y Álvarez de Toledo, daughter of the 4th Marquis of La Romana. He was originally the Marquis of Molina, but on the death of his older brother Alonso, he became the heir to all the titles of the house of Medina Sidonia.

He was educated in Spain, but was never interested in politics or a military career. He devoted almost his entire life to his farms in Rafol, Novelda, Molina de Segura and the pastures of Jimena de la Frontera.

He managed his estate very well, but when he inherited the bulk of the family assets, he had to deal with a huge amount of debt that his father had acquired. The most urgent ones were solved with the sale of the Coto de Doñana to Guillermo Garvey, for 750,000 pesetas.

As Grandee of Spain, he held important positions at court, such as Gentleman of the King's Chamber, or Chief Knight of María de las Mercedes, Princess of Asturias. He held the Collar of the Order of Carlos III, and was Master of the Real Maestranza de Caballería de Valencia.

To deal with other debts, he was forced to sell his palace on playa de la Concha, in San Sebastián, the Martorell castle and the Jimena de la Frontera estates, as well as the Castillo de Vélez-Blanco for around 80,000 pesetas. He died in his Madrid palace on 9 June 1915.

1865 births
1915 deaths
Dukes of Medina Sidonia